The 1999 Cork Junior A Hurling Championship was the 102nd staging of the Cork Junior A Hurling Championship since its establishment by the Cork County Board. The championship ran from 3 October 1999 to 21 November 1999.

The final was played on 21 November 1999 at Páirc Uí Chaoimh in Cork between Bandon and Courcey Rovers, in what was their first ever meeting in the final. Bandon won the match by 0-11 to 1-07 to claim their fourth championship title overall and a first title in 28 years.

Bandon's James Nyhan was the championship's top scorer with 1–12.

Qualification

Results

First round

Semi-finals

Final

Championship statistics

Top scorers

Overall

In a single game

References

1999 in hurling
Cork Junior Hurling Championship